Médina Yoro Foulah is a small town with commune status in south Senegal. It is the chief settlement of  Médina Yoro Foulah Department in Kolda Region, close to the border with Gambia in Haute Casamance.  

In 2013 its population was recorded at 3,000.

References

Populated places in Kolda Region
Communes of Senegal